Andrew McKelvie Hughes Provan (born 1 January 1944 in Greenock), also known as Drew Provan, is a Scottish former footballer who played in the Scottish Football League for St Mirren, in the Football League for Barnsley, York City, Chester, Wrexham, Southport and Torquay United, and in the North American Soccer League for the Philadelphia Atoms.

References

1944 births
Living people
Footballers from Greenock
Scottish footballers
Association football wingers
St Mirren F.C. players
Barnsley F.C. players
York City F.C. players
Chester City F.C. players
Wrexham A.F.C. players
Southport F.C. players
Philadelphia Atoms players
Torquay United F.C. players
Bath City F.C. players
Scottish Football League players
English Football League players
North American Soccer League (1968–1984) players
Scottish expatriate footballers
Expatriate soccer players in the United States
Scottish expatriate sportspeople in the United States